The Beechcraft Heritage Museum is an aviation museum at the Tullahoma Regional Airport in Tullahoma, Tennessee. It is focused on the history of the Beech Aircraft Corporation.

History 
The museum was founded by Carolyn and Richard Perry, Louise Thaden, W. C. Yarbrough, and John Parrish in October 1973 as the Staggerwing Museum Foundation. The museum opened to the public in June 1975. It became the Beechcraft Heritage Museum in 2007.

Fly-in 
The museum holds an annual fly-in called the "Beech Party".

Aircraft on display 

 Bay Super V SV109
 Bayles Lightning RB01
 Beechcraft AT-11 Kansan 41-27516A
 Beechcraft 17R Staggerwing 1
 Beechcraft B17L Staggerwing 21
 Beechcraft C17L Staggerwing 100
 Beechcraft D17S Staggerwing 395
 Beechcraft D17S Staggerwing 4835
 Beechcraft E17B Staggerwing 231
 Beechcraft F17D Staggerwing 333
 Beechcraft G17S Staggerwing B-3
 Beechcraft G17S Staggerwing B-7
 Beechcraft S18D 178
 Beechcraft C-45H Expeditor AF-824
 Beechcraft D18S A-187
 Beechcraft 23 Musketeer M-6
 Beechcraft F33A Bonanza CD-556
 Beechcraft 35 Bonanza D-9
 Beechcraft 35 Bonanza D-18
 Beechcraft H35 Bonanza D-4982
 Beechcraft S35 Bonanza D-7450
 Beechcraft 36 Bonanza E-103
 Beechcraft A36 Bonanza E-1252
 Beechcraft A36 Bonanza E-1503
 Beechcraft D45 Mentor GL-1111
 Beechcraft D50E Twin Bonanza DH-326
 Beechcraft 58TC Baron TK-79
 Beechcraft B60 Duke P-596
 Beechcraft B95A Travel Air TD-500
 Beechcraft 95-55 TC-1
 Beechcraft 2000A Starship NC-49
 Beechcraft U-21 Ute LM-01
 Cianchette Lionheart 3
 Swallow TP 163
 Travel Air 1000 1
 Travel Air 4000 1295
 Travel Air Type R Mystery Ship 1

See also
List of aviation museums

References

External links 

 Official Website

Aerospace museums in the United States
Museums established in 1973
1973 establishments in Tennessee
Museums in Coffee County, Tennessee